Ramalingam is a Tamil male given name. Due to the Tamil tradition of using patronymic surnames it may also be a surname for males and females.

Notable people

Given name
 C. Ramalingam, Indian politician
 E. Ramalingam, Indian politician
 Goka Ramalingam, Indian politician
 K. P. Ramalingam, Indian politician
 K. V. Ramalingam, Indian politician
 Kudanthai N. Ramalingam (born 1944), Indian politician
 M. Ramalingam (born 1939), Indian critic
 P. S. Ramalingam (died 2013), Indian politician
 R. Ramalingam, Indian politician
 Raghu Ramalingam Ambadapudi, Indian television producer
 Ramalinga Swamigal (1823–1874), Indian saint and poet
 S. Ramalingam, Indian politician
 T. Ramalingam (born 1904), Ceylonese lawyer and politician
 T. A. Ramalingam Chettiar (1881–1952), Indian lawyer and politician
 Venkatarama Ramalingam Pillai (1888–1972), Indian poet
 W. V. V. B. Ramalingam (1884–1962), Indian activist

Surname
 Ramalingam Chandrasekar (born 1963), Sri Lankan politician
 Ramalingam Paramadeva (died 2004), Sri Lankan militant
 Ramalingam Thyagraj (born 1950), Indian football coach
 Tiruchengodu Ramalingam Sundaram (1907–1963), Indian actor
 Saravanan Michael Ramalingam (1971–1996), Singaporean murder victim.

Other uses
 Gopal Ramalingam Memorial Engineering College, college in Chennai, Tamil Nadu

See also
 

Tamil masculine given names